Miroslav Almaský (born 8 July 1994) is a Slovak football midfielder who plays for MFK Skalica.

MFK Ružomberok 
Miroslav Almaský made his official debut for Ružomberok on March 8, 2014 against VSS Košice.

References

External links
 MFK Ružomberok official club profile 
 
 Futbalnet profile 
 

1994 births
Living people
Association football midfielders
Slovak footballers
MFK Ružomberok players
MŠK Rimavská Sobota players
MFK Skalica players
Slovak Super Liga players
2. Liga (Slovakia) players